The Women's shot put event at the 2011 European Athletics U23 Championships was held in Ostrava, Czech Republic, at Městský stadion on 15 July.

Medalists

Results

Final

15 July 2011 / 17:35

Qualifications
Qualified: qualifying perf. 15.50 (Q) or 12 best performers (q) to the advance to the Final

Summary

Details

Group A
15 July 2011 / 10:00

Group B
15 July 2011 / 10:00

Participation
According to an unofficial count, 23 athletes from 18 countries participated in the event.

References

Shot put
Shot put at the European Athletics U23 Championships
2011 in women's athletics